Monteiroa is a genus of flowering plants belonging to the family Malvaceae.

Its native range is south-eastern and southern Brazil, Uruguay and north-eastern Argentina.

The genus name of Monteiroa is in honour of Honório da Costa Monteiro Filho (1900–1978), a Brazilian professor of botany and director of the national school of agriculture in Rio de Janeiro and was a specialist in Malvaceae. 
It was first described and published in Bol. Soc. Argent. Bot. Vol.3 on page 237 in 1951.

Species
According to Kew:
Monteiroa bullata 
Monteiroa catharinensis 
Monteiroa dusenii 
Monteiroa glomerata 
Monteiroa hatschbachii 
Monteiroa leitei 
Monteiroa ptarmicifolia 
Monteiroa reitzii 
Monteiroa smithii 
Monteiroa triangularifolia

References

Malvaceae
Malvaceae genera
Plants described in 1951
Flora of Brazil
Flora of Uruguay
Flora of Argentina